

The Stralpes Aéro ST-11 is a French single-seat club-class sailplane designed by Christian Brondel and built by Stralpes Aéro of Challes-les-Eaux.

Design and development
The ST-11 is a cantilever mid-wing monoplane with a cruciform tail and the prototype first flew on 29 August 1982. The landing gear is a fixed semi-recessed monowheel gear and a tailskid, the enclosed single-seat cockpit has a one-piece canopy.

ST-11M Minimus
A powered motor-glider version.

Specifications

See also

References

1980s French sailplanes
Glider aircraft
Aircraft first flown in 1982